Asteronyx is a genus of echinoderms belonging to the family Asteronychidae.

The genus has cosmopolitan distribution.

Species:

Asteronyx longifissus 
Asteronyx loveni 
Asteronyx luzonicus 
Asteronyx lymani 
Asteronyx niger 
Asteronyx reticulata 
Asteronyx simplex 
Asteronyx spinulosa 
Asteronyx valkenburgensis

References

Ophiuroidea genera
Phrynophiurida